The Greece Central School District is a public school district in New York State that serves approximately 14,000 students in the town of Greece in Monroe County with over 3,700 employees and an operating budget of $180 million (~$13,489 per student).

The average class size is 21 students and the student-teacher ratio is 23:1 (elementary), 14-19:1 (middle-high school).

The district is the largest suburban school district in Monroe County and the eighth-largest district in New York State.

Some 2015 top Greece Central School District salaries:
• 12. Barbara A. Deane (Greece), $212,548.00 
• 258. Christina S. Sloane (Greece), $149,117.95
• 276. Lesley S. Flick (Greece), $147,658.71
• 361. Kathleen S. Graupman (Greece), $142,255.08
• 369. Beverly J. Ziegler (Greece), $141,839.98
• 532. Jamie N. Warren (Greece), $134,707.98
• 568. Toyia T. Wilson (Greece), $133,586.89
• 607. Mark A. Balsamo (Greece), $132,565.44
• 878. Diane R. Boni (Greece), $124,962.47
• 939. Kathryn A. Colicchio (Greece), $123,678.45
• 975. Linda A. Pickering (Greece), $122,927.81

Kathleen Graupman is the Superintendent of Schools.

History
The Greece Central School District was created in July 1928 by combining the former Greece school districts 3, 11, and 16.  Until the construction of Greece Olympia High School, students attended John Marshall or Hilton high schools.

Board of education
The Board of Education (BOE) consists of 9 members who serve rotating 3-year terms. Elections are held each May for board members and to vote on the School District Budget.

Current board members:
Sean McCabe, President     
Terry Melore, Vice President
Lisa Christoffel  
Richard Cunningham       
Joe Grinnan  
William Maloney    
Frank Oberg
Mary Caitlin Wight
Michael Valicenti

Leadership
Kathleen Graupman - Superintendent of Schools
Richard Stutzman - Interim Deputy Superintendent
Romeo Colilli - Assistant Superintendent for Finance and Administrative Services
Elizabeth Bentley - Assistant Superintendent for Human Resources
Kathryn Colicchio - Assistant Superintendent for Student Achievement and Accountability (Secondary)
Valerie Paine - Assistant Superintendent for Student Achievement and Student Support Services (Elementary)

By convention, elementary schools are named after the road on which they are located. Middle and high schools use classical Greek names.

Elementary schools
Autumn Lane, Principal - Tasha Potter, Assistant Principal - Kenneth Merkey
Brookside, Principal - Anthony Reale, Assistant Principal - Kenneth Merkey
Buckman Heights, Principal - Anitra Huchzermeier, Assistant Principal - Michelle Barton
Craig Hill, Principal - Melissa Pacelli, Assistant Principal - Kenneth Merkey
English Village, Principal - Cheryl Hurst, Assistant Principal - Jason Lewis
Greece Community Early Learning Center, Principal - Tracy DelGrego, Assistant Principal - Derek Warren
Holmes Road, Principal - Kristin Tsang, Assistant Principal - Michelle Barton
Lakeshore, Principal - James Palermo, Assistant Principal - Jason Lewis
Pine Brook, Principal - Elizabeth Boily, Assistant Principal - Deborah Goodman

Middle schools
Arcadia Middle, Principal - Brian Lumb, Assistant Principals - Michael Ferris and Michael Walker
Athena Middle, Principal - Jason Fulkerson, Assistant Principals - Lori Delorme-Shaw and Norma Vetter

High schools
Arcadia High, Principal - Gina Larsen, Assistant Principals - Kristina Cristofori (9th grade), Christina Wawrzyniak (10th & 12th grades) and Mason Moore (11th grade)
Athena High, Principal - David Richardson, Assistant Principals - Bryon George (9th and 11th grades) and Susan Fix (10th and 12th grades)

6-12 schools
Odyssey Academy (6-12), Principal - Dr. Jeffrey Green, 6th Grade/AP/IB Teacher on Assignment - Sumara Case, Assistant Principals - Laurie Platt (7th & 9th grades), Lori Ruggeri (8th and 12th grades) and Jeffrey Henley (10th & 11th grades)
Olympia School, Principal - Marc Fleming (also 12th grade administrator), Assistant Principals - David Hoffman (6th, 7th and 8th grades), Patricia Chodak (9th grade), Gail Watson (10th grade), and Kelly Flagler (11th grade)

Performance
In June 2007, the American Music Conference recognized the district as being among the 2007 "Best 100 Communities for Music Education".

On May 23, 2005, president George W. Bush visited the Greece Central Performing Arts Center located in the Athena Complex which houses both Greece Athena Middle School and Greece Athena High School.

Controversy
see bus monitor bullying video
Controversy arose in June 2012 when several students from Greece Athena Middle School were caught on camera verbally and physically abusing school bus monitor Karen Klein during a bus ride. Soon after the video became public, local FM radio station WBZA (98.9 the Buzz) reported the story and it spread virally on the internet Making the Bus Monitor Cry.  District officials have promised due process in handling the misconduct by the 7th grade boys

References

External links

Official Website
New York State School Boards Association

School districts in New York (state)
Education in Monroe County, New York
School districts established in 1956